Ketu Duplicatu  is a 1995 Telugu-language comedy film, produced by K. C. Reddy for Sri Rajeeva Productions and directed by Relangi Narasimha Rao. It stars Rajendra Prasad and Surabhi, with music composed by Koti. The film was a success at the box office.

Plot
The film begins on Vijay (Rajendra Prasad) a naughty guy who teases everyone with silly bets, besides, Usha (Surabhi) a charming girl has a similar habit. In the beginning, they are acquainted with petty quarrels which lead to love and get engaged. At the same time, Vijay learns that his best friend Ajay (Sivaji Raja) is terminally ill. So, to protect him, Vijay falsifies by changing reports and utilizes his medical allowance. But, unfortunately, Ajay dies, when Vijay gets scared out of sentence for misusing his medical facilities. So, he creates himself as dead. During the plight, Vijay's co-employee Dharmalingam (Suthi Velu) steals 3 lakhs rupees and indicts Vijay. Moreover, his other co-employee Rita (Haarika) denounces him by claiming herself as pregnant because Vijay denied and humiliated her. Right now, Vijay is under deadlock situation. The rest of the story is a comic tale that how Vijay gets rid of these problems by turning into a duplicate ghost.

Cast
Rajendra Prasad as Vijay
Surabhi as Usha
Satyanayana as Raghavaiah
Brahmanandam as Hareram
A.V.S as Rama Swamy
Mallikarjuna Rao as Shankar Rao
Subhalekha Sudhakar as Vijay's friend
Suthi Velu as Dharmalingam
Sivaji Raja as Ajay
Chitti Babu as Vijay's friend
Kallu Chidambaram as Thukaram
Krishna Chaitanya as Inspector
Gadiraju Subba Rao as Vijay's henchmen
Annapurna as Vijay's mother
Harika as Rita

Soundtrack

Music composed by Koti. Music released on Supreme Music Company.

References

External links

Indian comedy films
1990s Telugu-language films
Indian supernatural films
Films directed by Relangi Narasimha Rao
Films scored by Koti